Ahsa or AHSA may refer to:

 Al-Ahsa Oasis, an oasis region in eastern Arabia
 Al-Ahsa Governorate, a governorate in Saudi Arabia
 African Heritage Studies Association, a splinter group of the African Studies Association
 American Horror Story: Asylum, an American television miniseries
 American Horse Shows Association
 American Hunters and Shooters Association
 , the Gothic letter a; see Gothic alphabet, Ansuz rune
w

See also
 Al-Ahsa (disambiguation)